The Mouzon is a  river that traverses the departments Vosges and Haute-Marne in the region Grand Est, in northeastern France. It rises in Serocourt and flows west then north to join the Meuse at Neufchâteau. Its longest tributary is the Anger.

References 

Rivers of France
Rivers of Grand Est
Rivers of Vosges (department)
Rivers of Haute-Marne